A bear pit is an enclosure used to display bears, often for entertainment and bear-baiting.

Bear pit, or Bear Pit, may also refer to:

 Bear Pit (novel), a 2000 novel by Australian author Jon Cleary
 The Bearpit, Bristol, a roundabout and open space
 Bärengraben (German: "Bear Pit"), a specific notable bear pit in the Swiss city of Bern

See also
Berenkuil (disambiguation), Dutch for bear pit